Dr. Pradeep Kumar Balmuchu (born 26 July 1957) in Jamshedpur, Jharkhand, India is the politician from Indian National Congress Party. He was elected to Rajya Sabha from state of Jharkhand of the ticket of INC in May 2012.

He has studied B Com at Cooperative College Jamshedpur and done PhD. He resides at Dhalbhumgarh in District of East Singhbhum in Jharkhand.

Parliamentary Committees 

 Member, Committee on the Welfare of Scheduled Castes and Scheduled Tribes (May 2013 – May 2014)
 Member, Parliamentary Forum on Artisans and Craftspeople (April 2013 - May 2014)
 Member, Committee on Coal and Steel (Sept. 2014–Present)
 Member, Consultative Committee for the Ministry of Petroleum and Natural Gas

References

1957 births
Living people
People from East Singhbhum district
Rajya Sabha members from Jharkhand
Indian National Congress politicians